Appleby is an unincorporated community in Center Township, Washington County, Arkansas, United States. It is located on Arkansas Highway 170, south of Farmington and four miles southwest of Fayetteville.

References

Unincorporated communities in Washington County, Arkansas
Unincorporated communities in Arkansas